This list of Northwest University buildings catalogs currently-existing structures of Northwest University in Kirkland, Washington, Salem, Oregon and Sacramento, California. Buildings are listed alphabetically.

Kirkland
Kirkland buildings are listed on the published campus map.
 6710 Building
 Amundsen Music Center
 Donald H. Argue Health and Sciences Center
 Randall K. Barton Building 
 Beatty/Gray Residence Hall
 Butterfield Chapel 
 Crowder/Guy/Perks Residence Hall
 Davis Building
 F.I.R.s Apartments
 Greeley Center
 Hurst Library
 Millard Hall
 Ness Building
 Northwest Dining Hall
 Northwest Pavilion
 Pecota Student Center
 Student Housing East

Salem
5313 Faith Ave.

Sacramento
Capital Christian Center, 9470 Micron Avenue (closed June 15, 2018)

References

 

Northwest University